Beloit is a city in and the county seat of Mitchell County, Kansas, United States.  As of the 2020 census, the population of the city was 3,404.

History 
On permanent organization of the county in 1870, Beloit was selected as the county seat of Mitchell County, Kansas, and is located northeast of the center of the county on the Solomon River. The town site of Beloit was first settled by A.A. Bell in 1868 with the idea of improving the water power and for some time was known as Willow Springs. Beloit is named after Beloit, Wisconsin, the native home of a first settler. Beloit sits at the junction of the Union Pacific and the Missouri Pacific Railroads.

Local legend has it that the local Indians advised Bell to locate the town at a certain bend of the Solomon river to protect the town from tornadoes. As of 2022, downtown Beloit has been hit with a tornado only once, in November 1922.

The town of Beloit was platted March 26, 1872, and the original description as found in the recorder's office covers all of Section 9, and the south half of the southeast quarter and south half of the southwest quarter of Section 4, Town 7 and Range 7 west. The proprietors of the town were T.F. Hersey, A.A. Bell, George Campbell, Alexander Campbell, C.H. Morrill, Edward Valentine, W.C. Ingram, Daniel Kepler and Vinton Whitehurst. The town grew very rapidly, and in July 1872, was incorporated as a city of the third class. On March 10, 1879, Gov. John P. St. John proclaimed Beloit a city of the second class.

Beloit was home to the Beloit Juvenile Correctional Facility of the Kansas Juvenile Justice Authority.

Geography

Climate
The climate in this area is characterized by hot, humid summers and generally mild to cool winters.  According to the Köppen Climate Classification system, Beloit has a humid subtropical climate, abbreviated "Cfa" on climate maps.

Demographics

2010 census
As of the census of 2010, there were 3,835 people, 1,647 households, and 964 families residing in the city. The racial makeup of the city was 98.1% White, 0.3% African American, 0.4% Native American, 0.2% Asian, 0.1% Pacific Islander, 0.2% from other races, and 0.8% from two or more races. Hispanic or Latino of any race were 1.0% of the population.

There were 1,647 households, of which 25.6% had children under the age of 18 living with them, 48.3% were married couples living together, 7.7% had a female householder with no husband present, 2.6% had a male householder with no wife present, and 41.5% were non-families. 35.3% of all households were made up of individuals, and 15% had someone living alone who was 65 years of age or older. The average household size was 2.18 and the average family size was 2.83.

The median age in the city was 42.8 years. 21.6% of residents were under the age of 18; 10% were between the ages of 18 and 24; 20.6% were from 25 to 44; 26.8% were from 45 to 64; and 21% were 65 years of age or older. The gender makeup of the city was 49.9% male and 50.1% female.

2000 census
As of the census of 2000, there were 4,019 people, 1,623 households, and 994 families residing in the city. The racial makeup of the city was 96.94% White, 0.77% African American, 0.35% Native American, 0.37% Asian, 0.05% Pacific Islander, 0.17% from other races, and 1.34% from two or more races. Hispanic or Latino of any race were 1.07% of the population.

There were 1,623 households, out of which 27.5% had children under the age of 18 living with them, 52.9% were married couples living together, 5.3% had a female householder with no husband present, and 38.7% were non-families. 34.4% of all households were made up of individuals, and 17.2% had someone living alone who was 65 years of age or older. The average household size was 2.26 and the average family size was 2.93.

In the city, the population was spread out, with 24.3% under the age of 18, 10.9% from 18 to 24, 22.3% from 25 to 44, 21.2% from 45 to 64, and 21.3% who were 65 years of age or older. The median age was 40 years. For every 100 females, there were 93.5 males. For every 100 females age 18 and over, there were 92.7 males.

The median income for a household in the city was $33,227, and the median income for a family was $43,030. Males had a median income of $26,099 versus $20,694 for females. The per capita income for the city was $17,713. About 5.5% of families and 8.9% of the population were below the poverty line, including 12.2% of those under age 18 and 7.5% of those age 65 or over.

Government

Local
Beloit has a Mayor/City Council form of government. Voters elect eight city council members, two from each of the City's four wards, to four-year terms. Also, the voters elect a Mayor. The Mayor and the 8 City Councilors form the City of Beloit Governing Body.

The Beloit Governing Body meets in business session at 7:00 p.m. on the first and third Tuesdays of each month. Meetings take place in the Council Chambers at the Municipal Building.  Cable channel 12 televises regular meetings.

Districts
Beloit lies within Kansas's 1st congressional district, currently represented by Roger Marshall (politician). For the purpose of representation in the Kansas Legislature, the city is located in the 36th Senate District, currently represented by Elaine Bowers, and the 107th House District, currently represented by Susan Concannon. On the local level, Beloit is in both the first, represented by Tom Claussen, and second, represented by Mike Cooper, Mitchell County Commissioner Districts.  Beloit is mostly in Beloit Township, but the very far north side of the city is located in Plum Creek Township.

Education
The community is served by Beloit USD 273 public school district, where two of its three schools are located: Beloit Elementary School and Beloit Junior/Senior High School. Beloit Junior/Senior High School contains an average of 230 students per school year. This high school participates in the 3A division for extracurricular activities. The mascot for Beloit Junior/Senior High is the "Trojans."

Beloit also is home to St. John's Catholic Grade School and St. John's Catholic High School (Beloit, Kansas). St. John's Catholic High School contains an average of 60 students total each school year. This high school participates in the 1A, Division II category for extracurricular activities. The mascot for St. John's is the "Bluejay."

Beloit is home to the North Central Kansas Technical College and was home, until 2009, to the Kansas Industrial School for Girls.

Entertainment 
Beloit, KS is one of the larger cities in North Central Kansas. Even though it is a small town, it has several places to entertain. The first spot is Beloit's outdoor swimming pool in Chautauqua Park, where most families and visitors spend time during Beloit's hot, humid summers.

Another notable summertime entertainment is the Mitchell County Fair, every summer in the last week of July. The fairgrounds are on the north end of town next to Beloit High School. There are livestock judging contests, food trucks, carnival rides, and demolition derbies.

Beloit's downtown is a third notable spot, the hub for shopping and dining. Popular restaurants include Plum Creek, Bubba Q's Barbecue, The Kettle, and The Soda Fountain. Shopping in Beloit has decreased, but shops worth visiting include Ace Hardware, James Clothing, The Soda Fountain, S&S Drug, and Struble's Strudles.

Notable people

 Sam Colson, former javelin thrower.
 Scott Fulhage, professional football punter with the Atlanta Falcons and Cincinnati Bengals.
 Margaret H'Doubler, educator.
 Gene Keady, college and professional basketball coach.
 Waldo McBurney, former oldest living worker in the United States.
 Nancy Moritz, United States circuit judge for the United States Court of Appeals for the Tenth Circuit and former justice on the Kansas Supreme Court. She was born in Beloit and lived in nearby Tipton, Kansas until the age of 15.
 Mathew Pitsch, Republican member of the Arkansas House of Representatives from Fort Smith since 2015; former resident of Beloit. 
 Dean Sturgis, baseball player.
 Rodger Ward, professional race car driver.  Two-time Indianapolis 500 winner.

See also
 St. John's Catholic High School

References

Further reading

External links

 City of Beloit
 Beloit - Directory of Public Officials
 Beloit city map, KDOT

Cities in Kansas
County seats in Kansas
Cities in Mitchell County, Kansas
Populated places established in 1868
1868 establishments in Kansas